Macmillan Publishers (occasionally known as the Macmillan Group; formally Macmillan Publishers Ltd and Macmillan Publishing Group, LLC) is a British publishing company traditionally considered to be one of the 'Big Five' English language publishers. Founded in London in 1843 by Scottish brothers Daniel and Alexander MacMillan, the firm would soon establish itself as a leading publisher in Britain. It published two of the best-known works of Victorian era children’s literature, Lewis Carroll's Alice's Adventures in Wonderland (1865) and Rudyard Kipling's The Jungle Book (1894).

Former Prime Minister of the United Kingdom, Harold Macmillan, grandson of co-founder Daniel, was chairman of the company from 1964 until his death in December 1986. Since 1999, Macmillan has been a wholly owned subsidiary of Holtzbrinck Publishing Group with offices in 41 countries worldwide and operations in more than thirty others.

History

Macmillan was founded in London in 1843 by Daniel and Alexander MacMillan, two brothers from the Isle of Arran, Scotland. Daniel was the business brain, while Alexander laid the literary foundations, publishing such notable authors as Charles Kingsley (1855), Thomas Hughes (1859), Francis Turner Palgrave (1861), Christina Rossetti (1862), Matthew Arnold (1865) and Lewis Carroll (1865), with the latter first meeting Alexander in London on 19 October 1863. Alfred, Lord Tennyson joined the list in 1884, Thomas Hardy in 1886 and Rudyard Kipling in 1890. 

Other major writers published by Macmillan included W. B. Yeats, Rabindranath Tagore, Nirad C. Chaudhuri, Seán O'Casey, John Maynard Keynes, Charles Morgan, Hugh Walpole, Margaret Mitchell, C. P. Snow, Rumer Godden and Ram Sharan Sharma.

Beyond literature, the company created such enduring titles as Nature (1869), the Grove Dictionary of Music and Musicians (1877) and Sir Robert Harry Inglis Palgrave's Dictionary of Political Economy (1894–99).

George Edward Brett opened the first Macmillan office in the United States in 1869 and Macmillan sold its U.S. operations to the Brett family, George Platt Brett, Sr. and George Platt Brett, Jr. in 1896, resulting in the creation of an American company, Macmillan Publishing, also called the Macmillan Company. Even with the split of the American company from its parent company in England, George Brett, Jr. and Harold Macmillan remained close personal friends. Macmillan Publishers re-entered the American market in 1954 under the name St. Martin's Press. 

Macmillan of Canada was founded in 1905; Maclean-Hunter acquired the company in 1973. Following numerous mergers, Macmillan Canada dissolved in 2002 after John Wiley & Co. acquired it. 

After retiring from politics in 1964, former Prime Minister of the United Kingdom, Harold Macmillan, grandson of co-founder Daniel, became chairman of the company, serving until his death in December 1986.
He had been with the family firm as a junior partner from 1920 to 1940 (when he became a junior minister), and from 1945 to 1951 while he was in the opposition in Parliament.

The German Holtzbrinck Publishing Group purchased the company in 1999.

21st century

Pearson acquired the Macmillan name in America in 1998, following its purchase of the Simon & Schuster educational and professional group (which included various Macmillan properties). Holtzbrinck purchased it from them in 2001. McGraw-Hill continues to market its pre-kindergarten through elementary school titles under its Macmillan/McGraw-Hill brand. The US operations of Holtzbrinck Publishing changed its name to Macmillan in October 2007. Its audio publishing imprint changed its name from Audio Renaissance to Macmillan Audio, while its distribution arm was renamed from Von Holtzbrinck Publishers Services to Macmillan Publishers Services. Pan Macmillan purchased Kingfisher, a British children's publisher, from Houghton Mifflin in October 2007. Roaring Brook Press publisher Simon Boughton would oversee Kingfisher's US business.

By some estimates, as of 2009, e-books account for three to five per cent of total book sales, and are the fastest growing segment of the market. According to The New York Times, Macmillan and other major publishers "fear that massive discounting [of e-books] by retailers including Amazon, Barnes & Noble and Sony could ultimately devalue what consumers are willing to pay for books." In response, the publisher introduced a new boilerplate contract for its authors that established a royalty of 20 per cent of net proceeds on e-book sales, a rate five per cent lower than most other major publishers. Following the announcement of the Apple iPad on 27 January 2010—a product that comes with access to the iBookstore—Macmillan gave Amazon.com two options: continue to sell e-books based on a price of the retailer's choice (the "wholesale model"), with the e-book edition released several months after the hardcover edition is released, or switch to the agency model introduced to the industry by Apple, in which both are released simultaneously and the price is set by the publisher.  In the latter case, Amazon.com would receive a 30 per cent commission. Amazon responded by pulling all Macmillan books, both electronic and physical, from their website (although affiliates selling the books were still listed). On 31 January 2010, Amazon chose the agency model preferred by Macmillan. In April 2012, the United States Department of Justice filed United States v. Apple Inc., naming Apple, Macmillan, and four other major publishers as defendants.  The suit alleged that they conspired to fix prices for e-books, and weaken Amazon.com's position in the market, in violation of antitrust law. In December 2013, a federal judge approved a settlement of the antitrust claims, in which Macmillan and the other publishers paid into a fund that provided credits to customers who had overpaid for books due to the price-fixing.

In 2010, Macmillan Education submitted to an investigation on grounds of fraudulent practices. The Macmillan division admitted to bribery in an attempt to secure a contract for an education project in southern Sudan. As a direct result of the investigation, sanctions were applied by the World Bank Group, namely a 6-year debarment (reduced from 8 years due to an early acknowledgment of misconduct by the company) declaring the company ineligible to be awarded Bank-financed contracts.

In December 2011, Bedford, Freeman, and Worth Publishing Group, Macmillan's higher education group, changed its name to Macmillan Higher Education while retaining the Bedford, Freeman, and Worth name for its k–12 educational unit. Also, that month, Brian Napack resigned as Macmillan president while staying on for transitional purposes.

In 2012, parent company Holtzbrinck reorganized; Macmillan's consumer publishing operations were now led by John Turner Sargent from New York City.

In May 2015, London-based Macmillan Science and Education merged with Berlin-based Springer Science+Business Media to form Springer Nature, jointly controlled by Holtzbrinck Publishing Group and BC Partners.

In January 2019, Toronto, Canada-based online writing community Wattpad announced an agreement with Macmillan [sic, Springer Nature America] for handling sales and distribution in the U.S. for its new publishing division Wattpad Books, alongside rival Penguin Random House that will handle the U.K. and India market, and Raincoast Books for the Canadian market.

In November 2019, Macmillan announced that libraries would be able to buy only one copy of e-books for the first eight weeks after publication, in an effort to boost sales by creating long waits for borrowers at large library systems. This prompted complaints and some libraries boycotted the company; the policy was reversed in March 2020.

In September 2020, Macmillan announced that CEO John Sargent will be leaving at the end of the year due to "a disagreement regarding the direction of Macmillan." According to Holtzbrinck spokesperson Erin Coffey, the decision was made by Stefan von Holtzbrinck, CEO of the Holtzbrinck group.

Divisions

US publishing divisions with imprints

Other US divisions
Macmillan Publishers Services, formerly Von Holtzbrinck Publishers Services, distribution unit for independent publishers:
Bloomsbury USA
Drawn & Quarterly
Entangled Publishing
Graywolf Press
Guinness World Records
Kingfisher
Page Street
Papercutz
Review of Reviews

Pan Macmillan UK imprints

See also
List of largest UK book publishers

References

Further reading

External links

 The Macmillan Archive at the British Library

 
 
 The Macmillan Story: Bringing authors and readers together since 1843

 
Book publishing companies of the United Kingdom
Publishing companies based in London
Holtzbrinck Publishing Group
1843 establishments in England
Publishing companies established in 1843
1999 mergers and acquisitions
British companies established in 1843